La Ribera, also spelled La Rivera, just Ribera or Rivera, is a district of the Belén canton, in the Heredia province of Costa Rica.

Geography 
La Ribera has an area of  km2 and an elevation of  metres.

Locations 

 : Fuente, Labores (partial), Vista Linda, Cristo Rey (partial).
 : Echeverría (partial).
 Intel, once a semiconductor foundry, these offices now focus on services.

Demographics 

For the 2011 census, La Ribera had a population of  inhabitants.

Transportation

Road transportation 
The district is covered by the following road routes:
 National Route 1
 National Route 3
 National Route 111
 National Route 129

Rail transportation 
The Interurbano Line operated by Incofer goes through this district.

References 

Districts of Heredia Province
Populated places in Heredia Province